Great Britain, represented by the British Olympic Association (BOA), competed at the 1972 Summer Olympics in Munich, West Germany. 284 competitors, 210 men and 74 women, took part in 159 events in 18 sports. British athletes have competed in every Summer Olympic Games.

The Great Britain team included 69-year-old equestrian Lorna Johnstone - the oldest British athlete ever to appear in the Olympic Games.

Medallists

Gold
 Mary Peters – Athletics, women's pentathlon
 Richard Meade – Equestrian, three-day event individual competition
 Mary Gordon-Watson, Richard Meade, Bridget Parker, and Mark Phillips – Equestrian, three-day event team competition
 Chris Davies and Rodney Pattisson (Helmsman) – Sailing, Flying Dutchman

Silver
 David Hemery, David Jenkins, Alan Pascoe, and Martin Reynolds – Athletics, men's 4x400 metres relay
 Ann Moore – Equestrian, jumping individual competition
 David Starbrook – Judo, men's half-heavyweight (93 kg)
 David Wilkie – Swimming, men's 200m breaststroke
 David Hunt and Alan Warren (helmsman) – sailing, Tempest

Bronze
 Ian Stewart – Athletics, men's 5000 metres
 David Hemery – Athletics, men's 400m hurdles
 Ralph Evans – Boxing, men's light flyweight
 George Turpin – Boxing, men's bantamweight
 Alan Minter – Boxing, men's light middleweight
 Michael Bennett, Ian Hallam, Ronald Keeble, and William Moore  – Cycling, men's 4000m team pursuit
 Brian Jacks – Judo, men's middleweight (80 kg)
 Angelo Parisi – Judo, men's open category
 John Kynoch – Shooting, men's running game target

Archery

In the first modern archery competition at the Olympics, Great Britain entered three men and three women. Their highest placing competitor was Lynne Evans, at 16th place in the women's competition.

Men's individual competition:
 Roy Matthews – 2385 points (→ 17th place)
 John Snelling – 2356 points (→ 26th place)
 Ronald Bishop – 2244 points (→ 45th place)

Women's individual competition:
 Lynne Evans – 2313 points (→ 16th place)
 Carol Sykes – 2273 points (→ 21st place)
 Pauline Edwards – 2249 points (→ 25th place)

Athletics

Men's 100 metres
Brian Green
 Heat, round 1 – 10.41
 Heat, round 2 – 10.58
 Semifinals – 10.52 (→ did not advance)

Les Piggot
 Heat, round 1 – 10.54
 Heat, round 2 – 10.53 (→ did not advance)

Don Halliday
 Heat, round 1 – 10.58
 Heat, round 2 – 10.60 (→ did not advance)

Men's 200 metres
Brian Green
 Heat, round 1 – 21.26
 Heat, round 2 – 21.41 (→ did not advance)

Men's 400 metres
Martin Reynolds
 Heat, round 1 – 46.46
 Heat, round 2 – 46.11
 Semifinals – 46.71 (→ did not advance)

David Jenkins
 Heat, round 1 – 46.15
 Heat, round 2 – 45.99
 Semifinals – 45.91 (→ did not advance)

Gary Armstrong
 Heat, round 1 – 46.48
 Heat, round 2 – 47.10 (→ did not advance)

Men's 800 metres
Andy Carter
 Heat – 1:47.6
 Semifinals – 1:46.5
 Final – 1:46.6 (→ 6th place)

Dave Cropper
 Heat – 1:47.5
 Semifinals – 1:48.4 (→ did not advance)

Colin Campbell
 Heat – 1:54.8 (→ did not advance)

Men's 1500 metres
Brendan Foster
 Heat – 3:40.8
 Semifinals – 3:38.2
 Final – 3:39.0 (→ 5th place)

Ray Smedley
 Heat – 3:42.1
 Semifinals – 3:45.8 (→ did not advance)

John Kirkbride
 Heat – 3:45.3 (→ did not advance)

Men's 5000 metres
Ian Stewart
 Heat – 13:33.0
 Final – 13:27.6 (→ 3rd place)
Ian McCafferty
 Heat – 13:38.2
 Final – 13:43.2 (→ 11th place)
]
David Bedford
 Heat – 13:49.8
 Final – 13:43.2 (→ 12th place)

Men's 10000 metres
David Bedford
 Heat – 27:53.6
 Final – 28:05.4(→ 6th place)
Lachie Stewart
 Heat – 28:31.4 (→ did not advance)
Dave Holt
 Heat – 28:46.8(→ did not advance)

Men's marathon
 Ron Hill 2:16:30.6 (→ 6th place)
 Donald MacGregor 2:16:34.4 (→ 7th place)
 Colin Kirkham 2:21:54.8 (→ 20th place)

Men's 110m hurdles
Alan Pascoe
 Heat – 14.08
 Semifinals – 14.24 (→ did not advance)

Berwyn Price
 Heat – 13.94
 Semifinals – 14.37 (→ did not advance)
David Wilson
 Heat – 14.31 (→ did not advance)

Men's 400m hurdlles
David Hemery
 Heat – 49.72
 Semifinals – 49.66
 Final – 48.52 (→ 3rd place)

Men's 3000m steeplechase
Andy Holden
 Heat – 8:33.8 (→ did not advance)
Steve Hollings
 Heat – 8:35.0 (→ did not advance)
John Bicourt
 Heat – 8:38.8 (→ did not advance)

Men's 4 × 100 m relay
Berwyn Price, Don Halliday, Dave Dear, and Brian Green
 Heat – 39.63
Les Piggot, Don Halliday, Dave Dear, and Brian Green
 Semifinals – 39.47 (→ did not advance)

Men's 4 × 400 m relay
Martin Reynolds, Alan Pascoe, David Hemery and David Jenkins
 Semifinals – 3:01.3
 Final – 3:00.5 (→ 2nd place)

Men's long jump
Alan Lerwill
 Qualification – 7.86
 Final – 7.91 (→ 7th place)
Lynn Davies
 Qualification – 7.64 (→ did not advance)

Men's pole vault
Mike Bull
 Qualification – 4.80 (→ did not advance)

Men's shot put
Geoff Capes
 Qualification – 18.94 (→ did not advance)

Men's discus
Bill Tancred
 Qualification – 57.24 (→ did not advance)
John Watts
 Qualification – 53.86 (→ did not advance)

Men's javelin
Dave Travis
 Qualification – 74.68 (→ did not advance)

Men's hammer throw
Barry Williams
 Qualification – 66.32
 Final – 68.18 (→ 16th place)
Howard Payne
 Qualification – 64.56 (→ did not advance)

Men's decathlon
Barry King 7468 points (→ 15th place)
Peter Gabbett DNF

Men's 20 km walk
Paul Nihill 1:28:44.4 (→ 6th place)
Phil Embleton 1:33:22.2 (→ 14th place)
Peter Marlow 1:35:38.8 (→ 17th place)

Men's 50 km walk
Paul Nihill 4:14:09.4 (→ 9th place)
John Warhurst 4:23:21.6 (→ 18th place)
Howard Timms 4:34:43.8 (→ 25th place)

Women's 100 metres
Andrea Lynch
 Heat, round 1 – 11.52
 Heat, round 2 – 11.57
 Semifinals – 11.64(→ did not advance)
Anita Neil
 Heat, round 1 – 11.55
 Heat, round 2 – 11.58 (→ did not advance)
Sonia Lannaman
 Heat, round 1 – 11.45
 Heat, round 2 – 11.72 (→ did not advance)

Women's 200 metres
Donna Murray
 Heat, round 1 – 23.76
 Heat, round 2 – 23.69
 Semifinals – 24.03 (→ did not advance)
Della Pascoe
 Heat, round 1 – 23.97
 Heat, round 2 – 23.72 (→ did not advance)
Margaret Critchley
 Heat, round 1 – 24.04
 Heat, round 2 – 24.05 (→ did not advance)

Women's 400 metres
Jannette Roscoe
 Heat, round 1 – 53.67
 Heat, round 2 – 53.01 (→ did not advance)
Verona Bernard
 Heat, round 1 – 53.31
 Heat, round 2 – 53.29 (→ did not advance)
Janet Simpson
 Heat, round 1 – 54.13 (→ did not advance)

Women's 800 metres
Rosemary Stirling
 Heat – 2:03.6
 Semifinals – 2:02.4
 Final – 2:00.2 (→ 7th place)
Margaret Coomber
 Heat – 2:03.0 (→ did not advance)
Patricia Cropper
 Heat – 2:03.6 (→ did not advance)

Women's 1500 metres
Sheila Carey
 Heat – 4:13.0
 Semifinals – 4:07.4
 Final – 4:04.8 (→ 5th place)

Joyce Smith
 Heat – 4:11.3
 Semifinals – 4:09.4 (→ did not advance)
Joan Allison
 Heat – 4:14.9 (→ did not advance)

Women's 100m hurdles
Judy Vernon
 Heat – 13.37 (→ did not advance)
Ann Wilson
 Heat – 13.53 (→ did not advance)

Boxing

Men's light flyweight (– 48 kg)
Ralph Evans →    bronze medal
 First round – Salvador García (MEX), 4:1
 Second round – defeated Héctor Velasquez (CHL), 5:0
 Quarterfinals – defeated Chanyalev Haile (ETH), 5:0
 Semifinals – lost to György Gedo (HUN), 5:0

Men's light middleweight (– 71 kg)
Alan Minter →  bronze medal
 First round – bye
 Second round – defeated Reginald Ford (GUY), KO-2
 Third round – defeated Valeri Tregubov (URS), 5:0
 Quarterfinals – defeated Loucif Hanmani (ALG), 4:1
 Semifinals – lost to Dieter Kottysch (FRG), 2:3

Canoeing

Cycling

Eleven cyclists represented Great Britain in 1972.

Individual road race
 Phil Bayton – 5th place
 Phil Edwards – 6th place
 David Lloyd – did not finish (→ no ranking)
 John Clewarth – did not finish (→ no ranking)

Team time trial
 Phil Bayton
 John Clewarth
 Phil Edwards
 David Lloyd

Sprint
 Ernie Crutchlow
 Geoff Cooke

1000m time trial
 Michael Bennett
 Final – 1:09.45 (→ 17th place)

Tandem
 David Rowe and Geoff Cooke → 10th place

Individual pursuit
 Ian Hallam

Individual pursuit
 Mick Bennett
 Ian Hallam
 Ron Keeble
 Willi Moore

Diving

Men's 3m springboard:
 Christopher Walls – 332.07 points (→ 17th place)
 John David Baker – 321.15 points (→ 23rd place)
 Brian Wetheridge – 310.53 points (→ 28th place)

Men's 10m platform:
 Frank Dufficy – 271.77 points (→ 21st place)
 Andrew Michael Gill – 268.68 points (→ 22nd place)
 Brian Wetheridge – 262.59 points (→ 28th place)

Women's 3m springboard:
 Alison Jean Drake – 378.18 points (→ 12th place)
 Helen Mary Koppell – 242.22 points (→ 22nd place)

Women's 10m platform:
 Beverly Williams – 301.26 points (→ 12th place)
 Helen Mary Koppell – 178.17 points (→ 18th place)

Equestrian

Fencing

19 fencers, 14 men and 5 women, represented Great Britain in 1972.

Men's foil
 Barry Paul
 Graham Paul
 Mike Breckin

Men's team foil
 Mike Breckin, Barry Paul, Graham Paul, Anthony Power, Ian Single

Men's épée
 Teddy Bourne
 Ralph Johnson
 Graham Paul

Men's team épée
 Teddy Bourne, Bill Hoskyns, Edward Hudson, Ralph Johnson, Graham Paul

Men's sabre
 Richard Oldcorn
 John Deanfield
 Richard Cohen

Men's team sabre
 David Acfield, Richard Cohen, Rodney Craig, John Deanfield, Richard Oldcorn

Women's foil
 Sue Green
 Janet Bewley-Cathie-Wardell-Yerburgh
 Clare Henley-Halsted

Women's team foil
 Sue Green, Clare Henley-Halsted, Sally Anne Littlejohns, Janet Bewley-Cathie-Wardell-Yerburgh, Susan Wrigglesworth

Gymnastics

Hockey

Men's Team Competition
Preliminary round (group B)
 Defeated Mexico (6-0)
 Lost to India (0-5)
 Lost to New Zealand (1-2)
 Defeated Kenya (2-0)
 Drew with Australia (1-1)
 Defeated the Netherlands (3-1)
 Defeated Poland (2-1)
Semi-final Round
 Defeated Spain (2-0)
Classification match
 5th/6th place: Lost to Australia (1-2) after extra time → 6th place

Team roster
 Joe Ahmad
 Michael Crowe
 Mike Corby
 Bernie Cotton
 Tony Ekins
 Graham Evans
 John French
 Terry Gregg
 Dennis Hay
 Christopher Langhorne
 Peter Mills
 Richard Oliver
 David Austin Savage
 Keith Sinclair
 Paul Svehlik
 Rui Saldanha

Judo

Modern pentathlon

Three male pentathletes represented Great Britain in 1972.

Men's individual competition:
 Jeremy Robert Fox – 5292 points (→ 4th place)
 Barry Lillywhite – 4538 points (→ 36th place)
 Robert Lawson Phelps – 4427 points (→ 47th place)

Men's team competition:
 Fox, Lillywhite, and Phelps – 14257 points (→ 9th place)

Alternate member:
James Darby

Rowing

Men's single scull
Kenny Dwan
Heat – 7:57.49
Repechage – 8:10.32
Semi-finals – 8:38.62
B-final – 8:00.38 (→ 9th place)

Men's double scull
Tim Crooks, Patrick Delafield
 (→ 5th place)

Men's coxless pair
 Jeremiah McCarthy, Matthew Cooper
 (→ 12th place)

Men's coxed pair
Michael Hart, David Maxwell, Alan Inns
Heat – 7:49.56
Repechage – 8:01.14
Semi-finals – 8:21.61
B-final – 7:59.57 (→ 8th place)

Men's coxless four
Frederick Smallbone, Lenny Robertson, Jim Clark, Bill Mason
 (→ 7th place)

Men's coxed four
Alan Almand, Christopher Pierce, Rooney Massara, Hugh Matheson, Patrick Sweeney
 (→ 10th place)

Sailing

Flying Dutchman
Rodney Pattison (Helmsman) and Chris Davies (gold medal)

Tempest
Alan Warren (Helmsman) and David Hunt (silver medal)

Finn
Patrick Pym (Helmsman) (12th place)

Dragon
Simon Tait (Helmsman), Charles Currey and Ian Hannay

Soling
John Oakley (Helmsman), Barry Dunning and Charles Reynolds (5th place)

Star
Stuart Jardine (Helmsman) and John Wastall

Shooting

Fourteen male shooters represented Great Britain in 1972. John Kynoch won bronze in the 50 m running target event.

25 m pistol
 John Cooke
 Tony Clark

50 m pistol
 Frank Wyatt
 Harry Cullum

300 m rifle, three positions
 Malcolm Cooper

50 m rifle, three positions
 Malcolm Cooper
 Bob Churchill

50 m rifle, prone
 John Palin
 Phil Lawrence

50 m running target
 John Kynoch
 John Anthony

Trap
 Ronald Carter
 Brian Bailey

Skeet
 Joe Neville
 Colin Sephton

Swimming

Men's 100m freestyle
Malcolm Windeatt
 Heat – 54.70s (→  did not advance)

Brian Brinkley
 Heat – 55.06s (→  did not advance)

Men's 200m freestyle
John Mills
 Heat – 2:00.17 (→  did not advance)

Brian Brinkley
 Heat – 1:56.99 (→  did not advance)

Michael Bailey
 Heat – 2:00.79 (→  did not advance)

Men's 4 × 200 m freestyle relay
Brian Brinkley, John Mills, Michael Bailey, and Colin Cunningham
 Heat – 7:58.33
 Final – 7:55.59 (→ 8th place)

Weightlifting

Wrestling

References

Nations at the 1972 Summer Olympics
1972 Summer Olympics
Summer Olympics